Daniel Felipe Sá Nascimento (born 31 January 1992 in Vitória), or simply Daniel Felipe, is a Brazilian footballer. He currently plays for Remo.

Honours

Volta Redonda
Campeonato Brasileiro Série D: 2016

Remo
Campeonato Paraense: 2022

References

External links
 Daniel Felipe at playmakerstats.com (English version of ogol.com.br)
 

1992 births
Living people
Brazilian footballers
Madureira Esporte Clube players
Olaria Atlético Clube players
Volta Redonda FC players
América Futebol Clube (RN) players
Sampaio Corrêa Futebol Clube players
Associação Atlética Portuguesa (RJ) players
Botafogo Futebol Clube (PB) players
Clube do Remo players
Association football defenders
People from Vitória, Espírito Santo